Lake Shi or Shi Hu, literally Stone Lake, is a fresh water lake located in the southeast of Suzhou, Jiangsu Province. It is closed to Shangfang Mountain, which is a national forest park of China. The most famous spot of it is "Lake Shi String of Moons" on August 17 of the Chinese calendar, when nine reflections of the moon appear in a line. Lake Shi was a bay of the Lake Tai in ancient times.

References

Lakes of Suzhou